Louis Clark (27 February 1947 – 13 February 2021) was an English music arranger and keyboard player. He trained at Leeds College of Music. He is best known for his work with Electric Light Orchestra and Hooked on Classics. Clark started out as a bass guitarist for Birmingham band The Buccaneers, who later became Monopoly and eventually The Raymond Froggatt Band.

Electric Light Orchestra

Clark was the conductor and arranger of the orchestra and choir hired to back Electric Light Orchestra's sound, introduced on their album Eldorado in 1974.  He assisted Jeff Lynne and Richard Tandy in writing the string arrangements for the studio albums Eldorado, Face the Music, A New World Record, Out of the Blue, Discovery and Xanadu. He later played synthesizers for ELO during their Time tour. In 1983 he returned to arranging and conducting the strings on the Secret Messages album, and in 1986 he played keyboards again with the band on their small number of live dates.

Later he also joined the tour for ELO Part II in celebration of the band's 25th anniversary. He continued to work with ELO successor group The Orchestra.

Royal Philharmonic Orchestra
In 1977, Clark arranged the music of Renaissance for their Albert Hall concert with the RPO.

In the early 1980s, he conducted the Royal Philharmonic Orchestra on a series of records under the title Hooked on Classics. In 1985, he again worked with Renaissance singer Annie Haslam and the band's lyricist Betty Thatcher with the RPO to produce the album "Still Life". In 1982, he released the album "The Royal Philharmonic Orchestra Plays the Queen Collection", recorded by the Solid Rock Foundation. In 1983, he released the album "The Royal Philharmonic Orchestra Plays Beatles Collection", recorded by the Solid Rock Foundation, at the 20th Concerto Anniversary of The Beatles, having as guest artists Joan Collins, Elena Duran, Honor Hefferman and Roy Wood.

English Pops Orchestra
In 2011 Louis Clark was made president of the English Pops Orchestra, and returned to performing Hooked on Classics 'LIVE' with the EPO using many of the players that recorded the original albums.

Library music for television, commercials and radio
From the late 70's and through the 80's Clark composed library music for the production company Bruton Music. Some of the music  was, and sometimes still is, used for television, TV commercials (Cadbury's Flake, Nescafe) and radio (jingles for LBC).
In 1980 he arranged the strings for the songs in the film The Apple, a musical that was critically derided as one of the worst films ever made but has since gained cult status.

Other associated acts
Besides ELO, Louis Clark worked as an arranger for many other rock and pop artists:

With Roy Orbison 
 Mystery Girl (Virgin Records, 1989)

With Ozzy Osbourne
 Diary of a Madman (Jet Records, 1981)
 Bark at the Moon (Epic Records & Columbia Records, 1983)

With Roy Wood
 Starting Up (Legacy Records, 1987)

With Kelly Groucutt
 Kelly (RCA Records, 1982)

With America 
 Your Move (Capitol Records, 1983)

With Kiki Dee
 How Much Fun (co-arranged with Richard Tandy)

With Carl Wayne 
 Deeper than Love (Jet Records, 1982)
 Midnight Blue (Jet Records, 1982)

With Juan Martin 
 Serenade, Love Theme From The Thorn Birds (WEA Records, 1984)

With Asia 
 Astra (Geffen Records, 1985)

With Mike Berry 
 I'm a Rocker (Scramble Records, 1977)

With Simone 
 Flattery (Spiral Records, 1977)

With Renaissance 
 A Song for All Seasons (1978)
 Live at the Royal Albert Hall (King Biscuit Flower Hour Records, 1997)

With City Boy 
 Book Early (Vertigo Records, 1977)
 The Day the Earth Caught Fire (Vertigo Records, 1979)

Among others are UB40, Jon Spencer, Iris Williams and more recently Air Supply.

Discography 
Sourced from Louis Clark's official website - all albums performed by the Royal Philharmonic Orchestra unless otherwise stated.
(per-spek-tiv) n. (Jet 218, 1979)
Hooked on Classics (K-Tel One 1146, 1981)
The Queen Collection (EMI TV33, 1982 and MFP 41 5673 1, 1982)
Hooked on Classics 2 (K-Tel One 1173, 1983), later releases were subtitled "Can't Stop the Classics"
Hooked on Classics 3 (K-Tel One 1226, 1983), later releases were subtitled "Journey Through the Classics"
The Beatles 20th Anniversary Concert (Spartan SRFC1001, 1983)
Best of Hooked on Classics (K-Tel One 2266, 1984)
Great Hits from Hooked on Classics (Pickwick SHM3158, 1985)
Still Life (Spartan LCTV1, 1985) featuring vocals by Annie Haslam and lyrics by Betty Thatcher
Favourite Classics (Spartan SLCLP2, 1986)
Hooked on Classics Collection (K-Tel 5107, 1986)
The Very Best of Hooked on Classics (Pickwick PWKS 4017, 1986)
Later release: (K-Tel EMC2006, 1992)
Abbaphonic (Disky AC202, 1987 and Disky DLP2007, 1987)
Later released as Classic Abba (Icon ICONCD002, 1992), The Royal Philharmonic Orchestra Plays Abba (Disky DCD 5246, 1992; Emporio EMPRCD585, 1995; Disky INS 855362, 1999), The Music of ABBA (Hallmark 301372, 1995)
Beatlephonic (Disky DLP2015, 1987)
Later released as The Royal Philharmonic Orchestra plays The Beatles (Disky DCD5255, 1992; Disky INS 855372, 1999)
Hooked on Rhythm & Classics (Telstar 2344, 1988)
Later re-released with an extra track as The Classics in Rhythm (Arista ARCD-8588, 1989), and as Hooked on Rhythm and Classics (Pickwick PWKS 4223, 1994)
Hooked on Classics: The Ultimate Performance (K-Tel OCE2432, 1989)
Legends (Union LP1, 1989)
Seriously Orchestral Hits of Philadelphia Phil Collins (EDL 2555-1, 1990; Virgin RPOMC1, 1991; EDL 2555-2, 1993)
Hooked on Hooked on Classics (Music Club MCTC003, 1991)
Hooked on Classics X-tra Collection Vol 1 (ELAP 4718, 1991)
Hooked on Classics X-tra Collection Vol 2 (ELAP 4719, 1991)
The Royal Philharmonic Orchestra Plays Queen (Disky DCD 5256, 1992)
The Two Sides of Louis Clark: Rock Legends and Favourite Classics (Westmore Music CDWM108, 1993)
 Instrumental Classics (K-Tel ECD 3025, 1994)
 Also released as Hooked on Instrumental Classics (K-Tel 6133-2, 1994), albeit in a different track order and with an extra track.
The Royal Philharmonic Orchestra Plays Pop Legends (Disky DCD 5381, 1994)
More Hooked on Classics (Music Club MCCD 369, 1998)

Compilations:
Open Space: The Classic Chillout Album (Columbia 504690-2, 2001)
The New Classic Chillout Album: From Dusk Til Dawn (Sony STVCD148, 2002)

Death
Louis Clark died on 13 February 2021 in Elyria, Ohio, fourteen days short from his 74th birthday. His death at the age of 73 was announced by his wife, Gloria, on his Facebook page. No cause of death was revealed, but he had been ill for months and had suffered from kidney issues. In her post announcing his death, his wife Gloria wrote, "He passed very peacefully surrounded by love. This morning he watched Premier League soccer and listened to The Beatles, two things he loved. This afternoon I told him I loved him, he said I love you too, and we kissed. He was gone five minutes later. We love this man forever and always. He was a good man, loved by many and will be greatly missed by all. We want to thank family, friends and fans who have always loved and supported him."

References

External links 
 Official site (archived at Internet Archive, appears to had lapsed after 2011)
 Eaton Music: Louis Clark
 Hooked on Classics CD at CDuniversse.com
 Obituary on Best Classic Bands
 
 

1947 births
2021 deaths
21st-century British conductors (music)
Alumni of Leeds College of Music
British male conductors (music)
Electric Light Orchestra members
English composers
English conductors (music)
English male composers
People from Kempston